Boromycin is a bacteriocidal polyether-macrolide antibiotic. It was initially isolated from the Streptomyces antibioticus, and is notable for being the first natural product found to contain the element boron. It is effective against most Gram-positive bacteria, but is ineffective against Gram-negative bacteria. Boromycin kills bacteria by negatively affecting the cytoplasmic membrane, resulting in the loss of potassium ions from the cell.

Anti-HIV activity
Recent studies have suggested that boromycin has potent anti-HIV activity. It was found to strongly inhibit the replication of the clinically isolated HIV-1 strain as well as the cultured strain in vitro. The mechanism of action for the anti-HIV activity of boromycin is suggested to involve interfering with the later stage of HIV infection, and possibly the maturation step for the replication of HIV.

References 
 
 
 
 

Macrolide antibiotics
Tetrahydroxyborate esters
Secondary alcohols
Alkene derivatives
Boron heterocycles
Spiro compounds
Lactones